The S2G reactor was a naval reactor used by the United States Navy to provide electricity generation and propulsion on warships, and the only liquid metal cooled reactor yet deployed by the US Navy. The S2G designation stands for:

 S = Submarine platform
 2 = Second generation core designed by the contractor
 G = General Electric was the contracted designer

History 
An S2G was the initial power plant of USS Seawolf (SSN-575). This was one of three sodium cooled reactors (the core was moderated) ordered for the Seawolf program at the same time as three PWR units were ordered to support the USS Nautilus (SSN-571) program; In each case, one reactor was land-based for training and research, one intended for installation on a submarine, and one spare. The land-based unit corresponding to S2G was S1G reactor.

Persistent superheater problems on Seawolf caused the superheaters to be bypassed, resulting in mediocre performance. This and concern for the dangers posed by liquid sodium coolant led to the PWR type being selected instead as the standard US naval reactor type, and the S2G on Seawolf was replaced by the spare S2Wa reactor from the Nautilus program.  

The Atomic Energy Commission historians' account of the naval sodium-cooled reactor experience was:

References

United States naval reactors
Liquid metal fast reactors